The 1966 Chicago White Sox season was the team's 66th season in the major leagues, and its 67th season overall. Eddie Stanky managed the White Sox to a fourth-place finish in the American League with a record of 83–79, 15 games behind the first-place Baltimore Orioles.

Regular season

Season standings

Record vs. opponents

Opening Day lineup 
 Don Buford, 3B
 Floyd Robinson, RF
 Pete Ward, LF
 Johnny Romano, C
 Tommy McCraw, 1B
 Ron Hansen, SS
 Tommie Agee, CF
 Al Weis, 2B
 Tommy John, P

Notable transactions 
 May 27, 1966: Danny Cater was traded by the White Sox to the Kansas City Athletics for Wayne Causey.
 June 7, 1966: 1966 Major League Baseball Draft
 Carlos May was drafted by the White Sox in the 1st round (18th pick).
 Johnny Oates was drafted by the White Sox in the 2nd round, but did not sign.
 Ken Frailing was drafted by the White Sox in the 5th round. Player signed June 25, 1966.
 Chuck Brinkman was drafted by the White Sox in the 16th round.
 Geoff Zahn was drafted by the White Sox in the 34th round, but did not sign.

Roster

Player stats

Batting 
Note: G = Games played; AB = At bats; R = Runs scored; H = Hits; 2B = Doubles; 3B = Triples; HR = Home runs; RBI = Runs batted in; BB = Base on balls; SO = Strikeouts; AVG = Batting average; SB = Stolen bases

Pitching 
Note: W = Wins; L = Losses; ERA = Earned run average; G = Games pitched; GS = Games started; SV = Saves; IP = Innings pitched; H = Hits allowed; R = Runs allowed; ER = Earned runs allowed; HR = Home runs allowed; BB = Walks allowed; K = Strikeouts

Farm system 

LEAGUE CHAMPIONS: Fox Cities

Deerfield Beach franchise moved to Winter Haven, June 27, 1966

Notes

References 
 
 1966 Chicago White Sox at Baseball Reference
 Chicago White Sox at Baseball Almanac

Chicago White Sox seasons
Chicago White Sox season
Chicago White Sox